Isospiridae is an extinct family of fossil sea snails, Paleozoic gastropod mollusks.

This family is unassigned to superfamily. This family has no subfamilies according to the taxonomy by Bouchet & Rocroi (2005). It is classified as "Basal taxa that are certainly Gastropoda" by Bouchet & Rocroi (2005).

Genera 
 Isospira Koken, 1897 - type genus of the family Isospiridae. Species include:
 Isospira bucanioides Koken, 1897
 Isospira huttoni Cowper Reed, 1921
 Isospira lepida Perner, 1903
 Isospira nautilina Koken & Perner, 1925
 Isospira reinwaldti Öpik, 1930
 Isospira reticulatus Wängberg-Eriksson, 1964 - synonym: Isospira reticulata

Taxonomy 
Peter J. Wagner consider Isospiridae as synonym of Cyrtonellidae within Tergomya, The Paleobiology Database has become adatapted to this unpublished opinion by Wagner. This alternate taxonomy is as: Tergomya, Cyrtonellida, Cyrtonellidae.

References